The Cilento Coast (Italian: Costiera Cilentana) is an Italian stretch of coastline in Cilento, on the southern side of the Province of Salerno. It is situated between the gulfs of Salerno and Policastro, extending from the municipalities of Capaccio-Paestum in the north-west, to Sapri in the south-east.

It is particularly known for its almost unspoiled natural landscapes and the very high cleanliness of its waters.

Geography

There are 16 municipalities composing the coast, but only two (Agropoli and Sapri) are directly located by the Tyrrhenian Sea, and other two (Ascea and Pisciotta) have got their Marinas very close to the towns. Other localities are frazioni of hillside municipalities.
Agropoli, with the municipal seat and Mattine
Ascea, with Velia and Marina di Ascea
Camerota, with Marina di Camerota
Capaccio, with Torre Kernot, Laura, Paestum and Licinella
Casal Velino, with Marina di Casalvelino
Castellabate, with Santa Maria, San Marco, Licosa and Ogliastro Marina
Centola, with Palinuro
Ispani, with Capitello
Montecorice, with Agnone Cilento and Case del Conte
Pisciotta, with Caprioli and Marina di Pisciotta
Pollica, with Acciaroli and Pioppi
San Giovanni a Piro, with Scario
San Mauro Cilento, with Mezzatorre
Santa Marina, with Policastro Bussentino
Sapri, with the municipal seat
Vibonati, with Villammare

The promontory of Cape Palinuro, nearly at the centre of the Cilentan coast,  is a worldwide  touristic landmark.

Blue Flag
Due to the quality of its water, the Cilento Coast is the most awarded coastal area of Campania and one of the most ones of Italian Tyrrhenian Coast, by the Blue Flag beach. Many localities of the coast are also awarded with the Sails, from 5 to 1, of Legambiente.

See also
Cape Palinuro
Tresino
Porto Infreschi
Cilentan language
Amalfi Coast
Sorrentine Peninsula
Vallo di Diano
Cilento and Vallo di Diano National Park

References

External links

Coast
Province of Salerno
Coasts of Italy
Landforms of Campania